Junior Augustus Morias (born 4 July 1995) is a Jamaican footballer who plays as a striker for National League side Notts County.

A former youth-team player at Fulham, he turned professional at Wycombe Wanderers in July 2012. From there he was loaned out to Hendon and Boreham Wood, before he joined Boreham Wood on a free-transfer in October 2014. He scored the club's winning goal in the 2015 Conference South play-off final. He joined Whitehawk on loan in January 2016, before being sold on to St Albans City in July 2016, where he impressed enough to win a move to Peterborough United in January 2017. In July 2018, Morias joined EFL League Two Northampton Town on a two-year contract, however after one year he moved to St Mirren.

Club career

Wycombe Wanderers
Morias came through the Academy at Fulham, before he started a two-year scholarship with Wycombe Wanderers in 2011. He finished his first year as a scholar and signed his first professional contract in July 2012. He made his professional debut on 29 September 2012, in a 3–0 defeat away to Dagenham & Redbridge, coming on as a substitute for Jo Kuffour. He earned his first start on 3 November, in a 4–1 defeat at Crewe Alexandra in the FA Cup. He made 19 League Two appearances for the "Chairboys" during the 2012–13 season, all as a substitute.

He joined Isthmian League Premier Division side Hendon on loan in January 2013, making his debut in a 3–1 defeat at Croydon on 30 January. He scored four goals in seven games for the "Greens", and returned to Hendon on loan in August 2013, scoring one goal in another seven appearances. On 23 January 2014, he joined Boreham Wood on loan. By the end of the 2013–14 season he had scored eight goals in 15 Conference South appearances for the "Wood" and featured nine times for Wycombe, in addition to his seven appearances at Hendon.

However his contract at Adams Park was mutually terminated before the summer transfer window closed on 1 September 2014. His departure came less than three months after he signed a new one-year contract at the club, and manager Gareth Ainsworth refused to explain the reasoning behind the decision, saying only that "I'd rather not comment on how it came about, out of respect for Junior".

Boreham Wood
Following his release from Wycombe Wanderers, Morias joined Boreham Wood on a free-transfer on 6 October 2014. He scored 12 goals in 31 appearances across the 2014–15 season, including the winning goal in extra-time of the Conference South play-off final victory over Whitehawk at Meadow Park on 9 May 2015. On 29 January 2016, he joined Whitehawk on loan in search of game time and fitness, but featured in just two games for the "Hawks". He scored two goals in 29 National League matches for Boreham Wood in the 2015–16 campaign before he departed after rejecting new terms in June 2016.

St Albans City
On 4 July 2016, Morias joined National League South side St Albans City for an undisclosed fee. On the opening day of the 2016–17 campaign, Morias scored his first St Albans goal in a 2–0 victory over Concord Rangers at Clarence Park. On 6 November, he scored twice in the "Saints" 5–3 defeat to Carlisle United in the First Round of the FA Cup. His first goal against Carlisle went on win him both the FA's Goal of the Round and the club's Goal of the Season award. After selling Morias on to Peterborough, manager Ian Allinson stated that "When we signed Junior back in July, I said that the club would do everything possible to help him get back into the Football League, so I'm pleased we have delivered on our promise".

Peterborough United
On 1 January 2017, Morias joined League One side Peterborough United. He made his debut for "Posh" the following day in a 1–1 draw at Scunthorpe United, featuring for 80 minutes before being replaced by Tom Nichols. He scored his first goals in the English Football League on 4 February, his brace helping Peterborough to record a 3–0 win at Port Vale. He ended the 2016–17 campaign with four goals in 20 League One games. In September 2017, he was ruled out of action for five months after rupturing his thigh; manager Grant McCann said that "it's disappointing because he's started the season so well". After recovering from his injury he posted 31 appearances in the 2017–18 season, scoring seven goals. He was placed on the transfer-list at London Road by new manager Steve Evans in May 2018.

Northampton Town
On 13 July 2018, Morias signed for League Two side Northampton Town on a two-year contract for an undisclosed six figure fee.

St Mirren
On 22 August 2019, Morias signed for Scottish Premiership side St Mirren on a two-year contract for an undisclosed fee. His two goals from 40 games at St Mirren was a very disappointing result for the striker who just had no luck at all in a team which also struggled to score regularly. On 6 January 2021, Morias rejoined National League side Boreham Wood on loan for the remainder of the 2020/21 season.

King's Lynn Town 
On 25 June 2021, it was announced that he had signed with King's Lynn Town of the National League.

Dagenham & Redbridge
On 11 November 2021, Morias joined fellow National League side, Dagenham & Redbridge for an undisclosed fee.

Morias won the National League Player of the Month Award for April 2022 having scored six goals in six matches, including a twelve minute hat-trick against Barnet.

Notts County
On 15 March 2023, Morias signed for National League second-placed side Notts County for an undisclosed fee.

Style of play
Morias is a forward with an explosive shot.

Career statistics

Honours
Boreham Wood
Conference South play-off winner: 2015

Individual
National League Player of the Month: April 2022

References

External links

1995 births
Living people
Jamaican footballers
Association football forwards
Jamaican expatriate footballers
Expatriate footballers in England
Fulham F.C. players
Wycombe Wanderers F.C. players
Hendon F.C. players
Boreham Wood F.C. players
Whitehawk F.C. players
St Albans City F.C. players
Peterborough United F.C. players
Northampton Town F.C. players
St Mirren F.C. players
King's Lynn Town F.C. players
Dagenham & Redbridge F.C. players
Notts County F.C. players
English Football League players
Isthmian League players
National League (English football) players
Scottish Professional Football League players
Sportspeople from Kingston, Jamaica